Shinepukur Cricket Club is a cricket team in Bangladesh.

Before the 2016–17 season the Cricket Coaching School club defaulted on its player payments and was bought by Beximco, Bangladesh's largest conglomerate, and renamed Shinepukur Cricket Club, after Shinepukur Ceramics, a subsidiary of Beximco. Shinepukur Cricket Club were one of the twelve teams that took part in the 2017–18 Dhaka Premier Division Cricket League tournament. In their first match of the tournament, they beat Prime Doleshwar Sporting Club by eight wickets. They finished the group stage of the 2017–18 tournament in eighth place, with five wins and six defeats from their eleven matches.

List A record
 2017-18: 11 matches, won 5, finished eighth
 2018-19: 11 matches, 5 wins and a tie, finished seventh
 2021–22: 10 matches, won 4, finished eighth

Records
Shinepukur's highest List A score is 144 not out by Shadman Islam in 2017–18, and the best bowling figures are 5 for 46 by Delwar Hossain in 2018–19.

Squad
The following players represented Shinepukur Cricket Club in the 2017–18 season. Mohammad Saifuddin was the leading wicket-taker, with 14 dismissals, and Uday Kaul was the leading run-scorer, with 478 runs.

 Abdul Gaffar
 Fardeen Hasan Ony
 Sujon Hawlader
 Towhid Hridoy
 Afif Hossain
 Sabbir Hossain
 Shuvagata Hom
 Naeem Islam
 Shadman Islam
 Minhaz Khan
 Uday Kaul
 Mohammad Saifuddin
 Mohammad Sozib
 Touhid Tareq
 Raihan Uddin

References

External links
 Shinepukur Cricket Club at ESPN Cricinfo
 Shinepukur Cricket Club at CricketArchive

BEXIMCO group
Dhaka Premier Division Cricket League teams